Lamykin Dome is a domed feature rising to  which forms the ice-covered summit of Tange Promontory, on the coast of Enderby Land, Antarctica. The feature was plotted on charts by the Soviet Antarctic Expedition (1957) and named for Soviet hydrographer S.M. Lamykin.

References

External links

Ice caps of Antarctica
Bodies of ice of Enderby Land